Ernst Axel Edelstam (21 July 1924 – 17 August 2012) was a Swedish diplomat. He served in the foreign service for almost 40 years, including as ambassador to a number of different countries.

Early life
Edelstam was born on 21 July 1924 in Stockholm, Sweden, the son of the permanent undersecretary and chamberlain Fabian Edelstam and Hilma (née Dickinson). He was the brother of diplomat Harald Edelstam. He passed studentexamen in 1944 and received a Candidate of Law degree in 1949 before becoming an attaché at the Ministry for Foreign Affairs the same year.

Career
Edelstam served in New York City in 1950, in Washington, D.C. in 1951 and at the Foreign Ministry in 1953. He was acting second secretary in 1957 (temporary in 1955) and acting first legation secretary at the delegation of the Organisation for European Economic Co-operation (OEEC) in Paris from 1959 to 1961. Edelstam was first secretary at the Foreign Ministry from 1961.

He was acting head of the disarmament delegation in Geneva in 1967 and held the position as ambassador from 1970. Edelstam was foreign affairs councillor (Utrikdesråd) and acting head of the political department at the Foreign Ministry from 1972 to 1975 and was a member of the negotiating group from 1975 to 1976. He was ambassador in Cairo, Khartoum and Nicosia, from 1976 to 1981 and ambassador in Bangkok, Vientiane and Singapore from 1981 to 1983. Edelstam was then ambassador in New Delhi, Thimphu, Colombo and Kathmandu from 1983 to 1987 and ambassador in Oslo from 1987 to 1989.

Edelstam was head of Swedish Road Administration's international secretariat from 1989 to 1994. As retired Edelstam was active as local politician in Borlänge for the Liberal People's Party and was for a period chairman of the Swedish Pensioners' Association in Borlänge.

Personal life
In 1947, Edelstam married Gloria Horstmann. They divorced and in 1954 he married Ingrid Salén (born 1927), the daughter of lawspeaker Torsten Salén and Hilda Elfström. He was the father of Ellinor (born 1948), Torsten (born 1954) and Anne (born 1957). He later married the American Mary Ann. Edelstam was a frequent skier and had a great interest in cultural issues, foreign policy, history and literature.

Death
Edelstam died on 17 August 2012 and was buried on 3 September 2012 at Brännkyrka cemetery.

References

1924 births
2012 deaths
Liberals (Sweden) politicians
Ambassadors of Sweden to Egypt
Ambassadors of Sweden to Sudan
Ambassadors of Sweden to Cyprus
Ambassadors of Sweden to Thailand
Ambassadors of Sweden to Laos
Ambassadors of Sweden to Singapore
Ambassadors of Sweden to India
Ambassadors of Sweden to Bhutan
Ambassadors of Sweden to Sri Lanka
Ambassadors of Sweden to Nepal
Ambassadors of Sweden to Norway
Politicians from Stockholm
Swedish expatriates in the United States
Swedish expatriates in France
20th-century Swedish politicians